Charles Wesley "Chuck" Clemons Sr. (born June 21, 1957) is an American politician who has served in the Florida House of Representatives from the 21st district since 2016.

References

External links
  at Florida House of Representatives
 Chuck Clemons, Sr. profile at Vote Smart

1957 births
21st-century American politicians
Living people
Republican Party members of the Florida House of Representatives